Legislative elections were held in France on 21 August and 4 September 1881. The elections marked the collapse of the right compared to the 1877 elections.

It was a great success for the followers of Léon Gambetta, whom President Jules Grévy appointed premier two months after the election. His government only lasted 73 days, however, before falling over the issue of electoral reform. This led to three short-lived minority governments, until Jules Ferry was able to form a second government in February 1883 with the support of Gambetta's Republican Union.

Results

References

External links
Map of Deputies elected in 1881 according to their group in the House, including overseas (in french)

Legislative elections in France
France
Legislative
France
France